Tona is a municipality in the province of Barcelona, part of the autonomous community of Catalonia, northeastern Spain. It located in the Plain of Vic, in the comarca of Osona. It includes two exclaves to the east.

As of 2007, the estimated population stands at 7,800.

References

External links

Tona Municipality
 Government data pages 

Populated places in Osona
Municipalities in Osona